The Daegu class was a class of 2 destroyers by the Republic of Korea Navy. They entered service in 1973, with the last one being decommissioned in 1994.

History 
These were ships used by the US Navy during World War II and were modernized in electronics and weaponry during FRAM II. They were once magnificent ships, which throughout the 1970s constituted the backbone of the Republic of Korea Navy as a replacement for Chungmu class destroyers. Eventually, they were deemed too outdated. However, they remained in service until well into the 1990s, when they were downright obsolete. They were all leased till 1977 then bought by the navy.

They received two destroyers of the Allen M. Sumner class for the Republic of Korea Navy from the USA in 1973 as part of the American Military Assistance Program. More were later leased over in later years.

They were all put out of service between 1973 till 1994.

Ships in the class

Citations 

Destroyer classes
Dae Gu-class destroyers
Ships transferred from the United States Navy to the Republic of Korea Navy